The following is a list of travel podcasts.

List

See also 
 Travel literature
 Travel documentary
 Adventure travel

References

External links 
  on Player FM

travel
podcasts